The wildlife of Kazakhstan includes its flora and fauna, and their natural habitats.

Fauna

Argali
Bactrian camel
Barbel
Beluga sturgeon
Caspian seal
Caspian Sea wolf
Central Asian red deer
Channidae
Common spoonbill
Eurasian brown bear
Goitered gazelle
Golden eagle
Gray wolf
Great bustard
Great gerbil
Greater flamingo
spotted whip snake
Jerboa
Moose
banded Apollo butterfly
reticulated toad-headed agama lizard
Russian desman
Russian tortoise
Saiga antelope
Squacco heron
Steppe eagle
Sterlet
Tien Shan dhole
Brilliant ground agama lizard
Turkmenian kulan
Urial
Desert monitor
White stork

Felidae

Caracal
Asiatic wildcat
Jungle cat
Pallas's cat
Snow leopard
Turkestan lynx
Turkestan sand cat

Birds

The avifauna of Kazakhstan includes a total of 513 species, of which 5 are rare or accidental.

Flora
The diversity of a flora of Kazakhstan considerably varies both by structure and number of various systematic taxa of plants, and by geography, in particular, by nature-climatic zones and high-altitude belts. In Kazakhstan there are more than 6,000 species of highest vascular plants, about 5,000 species of mushrooms, 485 species of lichen, and more than 2,010 species of seaweed.

See also
 List of mammals of Kazakhstan
 Institute of Plant Biology and Biotechnology

References

External links

Biota of Kazakhstan
Natural history of Kazakhstan
Kazakhstan